Willow Creek Dam (National ID # CO01670) is a dam in Grand County, Colorado.

It impounds Willow Creek for irrigation water storage and hydroelectric power, part of the Bureau's larger Colorado-Big Thompson Project. The dam is owned by the Bureau and operated by the local Northern Colorado Water Conservancy District.

Recreation includes camping and fishing (for brown trout, rainbow trout, and salmon).

References 

Buildings and structures in Grand County, Colorado
Dams in Colorado
Reservoirs in Colorado
United States Bureau of Reclamation dams
Dams completed in 1953
Energy infrastructure completed in 1953
Hydroelectric power plants in Colorado
Bodies of water of Grand County, Colorado
1953 establishments in Colorado